Kishori Lal (born at Baijnath, Kangra district, Himachal Pradesh) is an Indian politician who was a Member of the Legislative Assembly (MLA) for the Baijnath constituency in Himachal Pradesh. He was elected as a member of the Indian National Congress in 2012.

Early life 
Kishori Lal was born to Sant Ram and Rajo Devi at Baijnath, Himachal Pradesh, in a farming family. He was educated at Panjab University Chandigarh.

Career 
Kishori Lal was a member of Baijnath Gram Panchayat, then served as its Pradhan for five consecutive elected terms, during which he was mentored by Sant Ram, a former state minister. He was elected as the Member of the Himachal Pradesh Legislative Assembly for Baijnath in 2012, when he represented the Indian National Congress party. The constituency was reserved for candidates from the Scheduled Castes. He also served as Vice President and General Secretary in Himachal Pradesh Congress Committee.

Described as a businessman, Lal stood for re-election from the Baijnath constituency in 2017. He lost to Mulkh Raj of the Bharatiya Janata Party, the person he had defeated in 2012.

Personal life 
He was born and educated at Baijnath. He is married to Jogindera Devi and has four children.

See also 
Twelfth Legislative Assembly of Himachal Pradesh

References 

https://en.m.wikipedia.org/wiki/Baijnath_(Vidhan_Sabha_constituency)

1947 births
Living people
Indian National Congress politicians from Himachal Pradesh
Himachal Pradesh MLAs 2012–2017
People from Kangra district